Naticarius hebraeus is a species of predatory sea snail, a marine gastropod mollusk in the family Naticidae, the moon snails.

Distribution
This species occurs in European waters and in the Mediterranean Sea.

References 

 WoRMS info
 Gofas, S.; Le Renard, J.; Bouchet, P. (2001). Mollusca, in: Costello, M.J. et al. (Ed.) (2001). European register of marine species: a check-list of the marine species in Europe and a bibliography of guides to their identification. Collection Patrimoines Naturels, 50: pp. 180–213
 Huelsken T., Marek K., Schreiber S., Schmidt I. & Hollmann M. (2008). The Naticidae (Mollusca: Gastropoda) of Giglio Island (Tuscany, Italy): Shell characters, live animals, and a molecular analysis of egg masses. Zootaxa 1770: 1-40

External links

 

Naticidae
Gastropods described in 1784